Thomas Grier Long (born in 1946) is the Bandy Professor of Preaching at Candler School of Theology at Emory University in Atlanta, Georgia.  He received his BA degree from Erskine College in 1968, the Master of Divinity from Erskine Theological Seminary in 1971, and the Ph.D. from Princeton Theological Seminary in 1980.  He began his career as a preacher at McElroy Memorial Associate Reformed Presbyterian Church near Atlanta, Georgia and since that time has taught at a number of seminaries, including Erskine, Columbia, Princeton, and Candler.

In 1996, Long was named one of the twelve most effective preachers in the English speaking world by Baylor University, along with the likes of Fred Craddock, Billy Graham, James Forbes, Barbara Brown Taylor and William Willimon.  He was ordained in the Associate Reformed Presbyterian Church and currently a minister in the Presbyterian Church (U.S.A.). He is married to professor of sacramental and liturgical worship Kimberly Bracken Long.

Long's field is in Homiletics and is a strong proponent of the two pillars of preaching: strong exegetical work held along with strong presentation skills.  Preaching magazine named his Witness of Preaching one of the 25 most influential books on preaching in the past 25 years.  A standard textbook in seminary and undergraduate preaching courses, the book advocates exegetical method seeking to discern a claim from the text to provide clarity of focus and function in sermons.

Books and publications
What Shall We Say? (2011), 
Accompanying Them With Singing: The Christian Funeral (2009), 
Preaching from Memory to Hope (2009), 
The Witness of Preaching, Second Edition (2005), 
Testimony: Talking Ourselves into Being Christian (2004), 
Beyond the Worship Wars: Building Vital and Faithful Worship (2001)
Hebrews (Interpretation) (1997) 
Preaching and the Literary Forms of the Bible (1989)

References

External links
Dr. Thomas G. Long's Faculty Page at Candler
Called by Name – a Thomas Long sermon

Living people
Place of birth missing (living people)
Erskine College alumni
Princeton Theological Seminary alumni
Emory University faculty
1946 births